The term rock rat has been used for several different types of rodents:

Members of the family Muridae:
Zyzomys, an Australian genus in the subfamily Murinae
Aethomys, an African genus in the subfamily Murinae
Members of the family Nesomyidae:
Petromyscus, a southwestern African genus in the subfamily Petromyscinae (though these are more frequently referred to as rock mice)
Members of the family Octodontidae:
Aconaemys, a genus in Argentina and Chile
Members of the family Petromuridae:
Petromus, an African genus often called dassie rats.
Members of the family Diatomyidae:
Laonastes, a genus from Laos

See also
 Rat Rock (disambiguation)